Events from the year 1799 in art.

Events
 March 19 – Sculptor Jean-Jacques Castex leaves Cairo for Upper Egypt in the group led by Pierre Girard.  He returns from the expedition with many drawings.
 James Barry becomes the first and (for 200 years) only member to be expelled from the British Royal Society of Arts, soon after the appearance of his belligerent Letter to the Dilettanti Society.
 Caspar David Friedrich suffers his first depressive interlude.
 Pierre-Henri de Valenciennes publishes Éléments de perspective pratique: à l'usage des artistes, suivis de réflexions et conseils à un élève sur la peinture, et particulièrement sur le genre du paysage (Elements of practical perspective, for the use of artists; followed by reflections and advice to a student on painting, particularly on the genre of landscape).

Works

 Lemuel Francis Abbott – Rear-Admiral Sir Horatio Nelson
 Jacques-Louis David – The Intervention of the Sabine Women
 Anne-Louis Girodet de Roussy-Trioson – Mademoiselle Lange as Danaë
 Francisco Goya
 Los Caprichos
 Charles IV in his Hunting Clothes
 J. M. W. Turner – Norham Castle
 Johann Zoffany – Dido and Lady Elizabeth Murray

Births
 January 7 – Eduard Magnus, German painter (died 1872)
 January 18 – Valentine Bartholomew, English flower painter (died 1879)
 January 31 – Rodolphe Töpffer, Swiss caricaturist (died 1846)
 February 14 – Walenty Wańkowicz, Belarusian-Polish painter (died 1842)
 February 27 – Frederick Catherwood, English artist and architect (died 1854)
 March 30 – Berndt Godenhjelm, Finnish painter (died 1881)
 May 26 – August Kopisch, German poet and painter (died 1853)
 June 10 – Fyodor Bruni, Russian painter of Italian descent (died 1875)
 August 12 – Patrick MacDowell, Irish sculptor from Belfast (died 1870)
 September 20 – Edward Calvert, English printmaker and painter (died 1883)
 October 30 – Emil Bærentzen, Danish portrait painter and lithographer (died 1868)
 December 12 – Karl Briullov, Russian painter who transitioned from the Russian Neoclassicism to Romanticism (died 1852)
 date unknown
 Henri Decaisne, Belgian historical and portrait painter (died 1852)
 Eduard Clemens Fechner, German portrait painter and etcher (died 1861)
 William Simson, Scottish-born painter (died 1847)

Deaths
 February 1 – Ferdinand Kobell, German painter and engraver (born 1740)
 February 9 – Johann Baptist Babel, Swiss sculptor (born 1716)
 February 14 – Luis Paret y Alcázar – Spanish painter of the late-Baroque or Rococo period (born 1746)
 March 18  – Adam Friedrich Oeser, German etcher, painter and sculptor (born 1717)
 June 1 – James Tassie, Scottish engraver (born 1735)
 August 3 – Hendrik Kobell, Dutch landscape and marine painter, etcher, draftsman and watercolorist (born 1751)
 August 4 – John Bacon, English sculptor (born 1740)
 November 30 – Guillaume Voiriot, French portrait painter (born 1713)
 December 8 – Giuseppe Cades, Italian sculptor, painter, and engraver (born 1750)
 December 9 – Bartolomeo Cavaceppi, Italian sculptor (born 1716)
 date unknown
 William Baillie, British artist working in India (born 1752/1753)
 Johann Balzer, Czech etcher and engraver (born 1738)
 Gabriele Bella, Italian Baroque painter (born 1730)
 Jacques-Louis Copia, French engraver (born 1764)
 Luo Ping, Chinese Qing dynasty painter, one of the Eight Eccentrics of Yangzhou (born 1733)
 Marten Waefelaerts, Flemish landscape painter (born 1748)

 
Years of the 18th century in art
1790s in art